Onkabetse Nkobolo (born 23 July 1993) is a Botswana sprinter specialising in the 400 metres. He competed at the 2015 World Championships in Beijing narrowly missing the semifinals. In addition, he won two medals at the 2015 African Games. His personal bests in the event are 45.10 seconds outdoors (Brazzaville 2015) and 46.86 seconds indoors (San Sebastián 2015).

International competitions

1Did not finish in the semifinals

References

External links
 

1993 births
Living people
People from Francistown
Botswana male sprinters
World Athletics Championships athletes for Botswana
Athletes (track and field) at the 2016 Summer Olympics
Olympic athletes of Botswana
Commonwealth Games medallists in athletics
Commonwealth Games gold medallists for Botswana
Athletes (track and field) at the 2018 Commonwealth Games

African Games medalists in athletics (track and field)
African Games silver medalists for Botswana
African Games bronze medalists for Botswana
African Games gold medalists for Botswana
Athletes (track and field) at the 2015 African Games
Athletes (track and field) at the 2019 African Games
Medallists at the 2018 Commonwealth Games